This article lists feature-length British films and full-length documentaries that have their premiere in 2020 and were at least partly produced by Great Britain or the United Kingdom. It does not feature short films, medium-length films, made-for-TV films, pornographic films, filmed theater, VR films, and interactive films. It also does not include films screened in previous years that had official release dates in 2020.

Due to the COVID-19 pandemic, many British films were delayed from release and premiere including No Time to Die, Stardust, Blithe Spirit, A Boy Called Christmas and Everybody's Talking About Jamie.

Film premieres

January–March

April–June

July–September

October–December

Other premieres

Culturally British films 
The following list comprises films not produced by Great Britain or the United Kingdom but is strongly associated with British culture. The films in this list should fulfill at least three of the following criteria:
 The film is adapted from a British source material.
 The story is at least partially set in the United Kingdom.
 The film was at least partially shot in the United Kingdom.
 Many of the film's cast and crew members are British.

British winners

Listed here are the British nominees at the five most prestigious film award ceremonies in the English-speaking world: the Academy Awards, British Academy Film Awards, Critics' Choice Awards, Golden Globe Awards, and Screen Actors Guild Awards, that were held during 2020, celebrating the best films of 2019.  The British nominations were led by 1917 along with Once Upon a Time in Hollywood, which was co-produced by the United States. 1917 led in the technical categories with multiple wins in cinematography, sound, special effects, and production design. Notably, a number of British technicians were nominated for non-British films such as Le Mans '66, Star Wars: The Rise of Skywalker, and Ad Astra. Marriage Story and Once Upon a Time in Hollywood, both British-American co-productions, unanimously won the Best Supporting Actress and Actor awards respectively. British films did, however, notably lose out to Parasite from South Korea.

Academy Awards
The 92nd Academy Awards honoring the best films of 2019 were held on 9 February 2020.

British winners:
 1917 (Best Cinematography, Best Sound Mixing, Best Visual Effects)
 Judy (Best Actress)
 Marriage Story (Best Supporting Actress)
 Once Upon a Time in Hollywood (Best Supporting Actor, Best Production Design)
 Rocketman (Best Original Song)
 Bernie Taupin (Best Original Song) – "(I'm Gonna) Love Me Again" (Rocketman)
 Elton John (Best Original Song) – "(I'm Gonna) Love Me Again" (Rocketman) 
 Jacqueline Durran (Best Costume Design) – Little Women
 Mark Taylor (Best Sound Mixing) – 1917 
 Roger Deakins (Best Cinematography) – 1917 
 Stuart Wilson (Best Sound Mixing) – 1917
 Learning to Skateboard in a Warzone (If You're a Girl) (Best Documentary Feature (Short Subject) ) 
 Elena Andreicheva (Best Documentary Feature (Short Subject)) – Learning to Skateboard in a Warzone (If You're a Girl)

British nominees:
 1917 (Best Picture, Best Director, Best Original Screenplay, Best Sound Editing, Best Production Design, Best Original Score, Best Makeup and Hair)
 For Sama (Best Documentary)
 Judy (Best Makeup and Hair)
 Marriage Story (Best Picture, Best Actor, Best Actress, Best Original Screenplay, Best Original Score)
 Once Upon a Time in Hollywood (Best Picture, Best Actor, Best Director, Best Original Screenplay, Best Cinematography, Best Sound Editing, Best Sound Mixing, Best Costume Design)
 The Two Popes (Best Actor, Best Supporting Actor, Best Adapted Screenplay)
 Andy Nelson (Best Sound) – Star Wars: The Rise of Skywalker
 Anthony Hopkins (Best Supporting Actor) – The Two Popes
 Callum McDougall (Best Picture) – 1917 
 Christopher Peterson (Best Costume Design) – The Irishman
 Cynthia Erivo (Best Actress, Best Original Song) – Harriet,  "Stand Up" (Harriet)
 David Heyman (Best Picture) – Marriage Story, Once Upon a Time in Hollywood
 Edward Watts (Best Documentary) – For Sama
 Florence Pugh (Best Supporting Actress) – Little Women
 Jayne-Ann Tenggren (Best Picture) – 1917 
 Jeremy Woodhead (Best Make Up & Hair) – Judy
 Jonathan Pryce (Best Actor) – The Two Popes
 Kay Georgiou (Best Make Up & Hair) – Joker
 Krysty Wilson-Cairns (Best Original Screenplay) – 1917 
 Lee Sandales (Best Production Design) – 1917
 Naomi Donne (Best Make Up & Hair) – 1917
 Neal Scanlan (Best Visual Effects) – Star Wars: The Rise of Skywalker
 Oliver Tarney (Best Sound Editing) – 1917 
 Paul Massey (Best Sound Mixing) – Le Mans '66
 Pippa Harris (Best Picture) – 1917 
 Rachael Tate (Best Sound Editing) – 1917
 Roger Guyett (Best Visual Effects) – Star Wars: The Rise of Skywalker
 Sam Mendes (Best Director, Best Original Screenplay) – 1917 
 Sandy Powell (Best Costume Design) – The Irishman
 Tom Johnson (Best Sound Mixing) – Ad Astra

British Academy Film Awards
The 73rd British Academy Film Awards was presented on 2 February 2020.

British winners:
 1917 (Best Film, Outstanding British Film, Best Director, Best Original Score, Best Sound, Best Cinematography, Best Production Design, Best Make Up & Hair, Best Special Visual Effects)
 Bait (Outstanding Debut by a British Writer, Director or Producer)
 For Sama (Best Documentary)
 Judy (Best Leading Actress)
 Marriage Story (Best Supporting Actress)
 Once Upon a Time in Hollywood (Best Supporting Actor)
 Andy Serkis (Outstanding British contribution to cinema)
 Callum McDougall (Best Film, Outstanding British Film) – 1917 
 Jayne-Ann Tenggren (Best Film, Outstanding British Film) – 1917 
 Kate Byers (Outstanding Debut by a British Writer, Director or Producer) – Bait
 Lee Sandales (Best Production Design) – 1917
 Linn Waite (Outstanding Debut by a British Writer, Director or Producer) – Bait
 Mark Jenkin (Outstanding British Film, Outstanding Debut by a British Writer, Director or Producer) – Bait
 Mark Taylor (Best Sound) – 1917 
 Micheal Ward (EE Rising Star Award)
 Naomi Donne (Best Make Up & Hair) –  1917
 Oliver Tarney (Best Sound Editing) – 1917 
 Pippa Harris (Best Film, Outstanding British Film) – 1917 
 Rachael Tate (Best Sound) – 1917
 Sam Mendes (Best Film, Outstanding British Film, Best Director) – 1917 
 Roger Deakins (Best Cinematography) – 1917 
 Stuart Wilson (Best Sound) – 1917
 Granddad Was A Romantic. – Maryam Mohajer (Best British Short Animation)
 Learning to Skateboard in a Warzone (If You're a Girl) – Carol Dysinger and Elena Andreicheva (Best British Short Film)

British nominees:
 Bait (Outstanding Debut by a British Writer, Director or Producer)
 Diego Maradona (Best Documentary)
 For Sama (Outstanding British Film, Outstanding Debut by a British Writer, Director or Producer, Best Film Not in the English Language)
 Judy (Best Costume Design, Best Make Up & Hair)
 Maiden (Outstanding Debut by a British Writer, Director or Producer)
 Marriage Story (Best Original Screenplay, Best Leading Actor, Best Leading Actress, Best Casting)
 Once Upon a Time in Hollywood (Best Film, Best Director, Best Leading Actor, Best Supporting Actress, Best Original Screenplay, Best Production Design, Best Costume Design, Best Editing, Best Casting)
 Only You (Outstanding Debut by a British Writer, Director or Producer)
 The Personal History of David Copperfield (Best Casting)
 Rocketman (Outstanding British Film, Best Leading Actor, Best Sound, Best Make Up & Hair)
 A Shaun the Sheep Movie: Farmageddon (Best Animated Film)
 Sorry We Missed You (Outstanding British Film)
 The Two Popes (Outstanding British Film, Best Leading Actor, Best Supporting Actor, Best Adapted Screenplay, Best Casting)
 Wild Rose (Best Leading Actress)
 Adam Bohling (Outstanding British Film) – Rocketman
 Alex Holmes (Outstanding Debut by a British Writer, Director or Producer) – Maiden 
 Alvaro Delgado-Aparicio (Outstanding Debut by a British Writer, Director or Producer) – Retablo
 Andy Nelson (Best Sound) – Star Wars: The Rise of Skywalker
 Anthony Hopkins (Best Supporting Actor) – The Two Popes
 Asif Kapadia (Best Documentary) – Diego Maradona
 Christopher Peterson (Best Costume Design) – The Irishman
 Danny Sheehan (Best Sound) – Rocketman
 David Heyman (Best Film) – Once Upon a Time in Hollywood
 David Reid (Outstanding British Film) – Rocketman
 Dexter Fletcher (Outstanding British Film) – Rocketman
 Edward Watts (Outstanding British Film, Outstanding Debut by a British Writer, Director or Producer, Best Film Not in the English Language) – For Sama
 Florence Pugh (Best Supporting Actress) – Little Women
 Harry Wootliff (Outstanding Debut by a British Writer, Director or Producer) – Only You 
 Jack Lowden (EE Rising Star Award)
 Jacqueline Durran (Best Costume Design) – Little Women
 Jeremy Woodhead (Best Make Up & Hair) – Judy
 Jonathan Pryce (Best Leading Actor) – The Two Popes
 Julian Day (Best Costume Design) – Rocketman
 Kate Byers (Outstanding British Film) – Bait
 Kay Georgiou (Best Make Up & Hair) – Joker
 Ken Loach (Outstanding British Film) – Sorry We Missed You
 Lee Hall (Outstanding British Film) – Rocketman
 Linn Waite (Outstanding British Film) – Bait
 Lizzie Yianni Georgiou (Best Make Up & Hair) – Rocketman
 Mark Jenkin (Outstanding British Film) – Bait
 Matthew Collinge (Best Sound) – Rocketman
 Matthew Vaughn (Outstanding British Film) – Rocketman
 Mike Prestwood Smith (Best Sound) – Rocketman 
 Neal Scanlan (Best Special Visual Effects) – Star Wars: The Rise of Skywalker
 Paul Massey (Best Sound Mixing) – Le Mans '66
 Paul Kavanagh (Best Special Visual Effects) – Star Wars: The Rise of Skywalker
 Rebecca O'Brien (Outstanding British Film) – Sorry We Missed You
 Roger Guyett (Best Special Visual Effects) – Star Wars: The Rise of Skywalker
 Roman Griffin Davis (Best Young Actor/Actress) – Jojo Rabbit 
 Sandy Powell (Best Costume Design) – The Irishman
 Sarah Crowe (Best Casting) – The Personal History of David Copperfield
 Stuart Wilson (Best Sound) – Star Wars: The Rise of Skywalker
 Taron Egerton (Best Leading Actor) – Rocketman 
 Tracey Seaward (Outstanding British Film) – The Two Popes
 Victoria Thomas (Best Casting) – Once Upon a Time in Hollywood 
 Azaar – Myriam Raja and Nathanael Baring (Best British Short Film)
 Goldfish – Hector Dockrill, Harri Kamalanathan, Benedict Turnbull, and Laura Dockrill (Best British Short Film)
 In Her Boots – Kathrin Steinbacher (Best British Short Animation)
 Kamali – Sasha Rainbow and Rosalind Croad (Best British Short Film)
 The Magic Boat – Naaman Azhari and Lilia Laurel (Best British Short Animation)
 The Trap – Lena Headey and Anthony Fitzgerald (Best British Short Film)

Critics' Choice Awards
The 25th Critics' Choice Awards was presented on 12 January 2020.

British winners:
 1917 (Best Director, Best Cinematography, Best Editing)
 Judy (Best Actress)
 Marriage Story (Best Supporting Actress)
 Once Upon a Time in Hollywood (Best Picture, Best Supporting Actor, Best Original Screenplay, Best Production Design)
 Rocketman (Best Song) **TIE**
 Wild Rose (Best Song) **TIE**
 Roger Deakins (Best Cinematography) – 1917 
 Roman Griffin Davis (Best Young Actor/Actress) – Jojo Rabbit 
 Sam Mendes (Best Director) – 1917British nominees:
 1917 (Best Picture, Best Production Design, Best Visual Effects, Best Action Movie, Best Score)
 The Aeronauts (Best Visual Effects)
 Downton Abbey (Best Production Design, Best Costume Design)
 Judy (Best Hair and Makeup)
 Marriage Story (Best Picture, Best Director, Best Actor, Best Actress, Best Acting Ensemble, Best Original Screenplay, Best Score)
 Once Upon a Time in Hollywood (Best Director, Best Actor, Best Young Actor/Actress, Best Acting Ensemble, Best Cinematography, Best Editing, Best Costume Design, Best Hair and Makeup)
 Rocketman (Best Costume Design, Best Hair and Makeup)
 The Two Popes (Best Supporting Actor, Best Adapted Screenplay)
 Anna Robbins (Best Costume Design) – Downton Abbey Anthony Hopkins (Best Supporting Actor) – The Two Popes Archie Yates (Best Young Actor/Actress) – Jojo Rabbit Christopher Peterson (Best Costume Design) – The Irishman Cynthia Erivo (Best Actress) – Harriet Donal Woods (Best Production Design) – Downton Abbey Florence Pugh (Best Supporting Actress) – Little Women Gina Cromwell (Best Production Design) – Downton Abbey Jacqueline Durran (Best Costume Design) – Little Women Julian Day (Best Costume Design) – Rocketman Lee Sandales (Best Production Design) – 1917 Noah Jupe (Best Young Actor/Actress) – Honey Boy Sandy Powell (Best Costume Design) – The IrishmanGolden Globe Awards
The 77th Golden Globe Awards was presented on 5 January 2020.

British winners:
 1917 (Best Motion Picture – Drama, Best Director)
 Judy (Best Performance in a Motion Picture – Musical or Comedy – Actress)
 Marriage Story (Best Supporting Performance in a Motion Picture – Actress)
 Once Upon a Time in Hollywood (Best Motion Picture – Musical or Comedy, Best Supporting Performance in a Motion Picture – Actor, Best Screenplay)
 Rocketman (Best Performance in a Motion Picture – Musical or Comedy – Actor, Best Original Song)
 Bernie Taupin (Best Original Song) – "(I'm Gonna) Love Me Again" (Rocketman)
 Elton John (Best Original Song) – "(I'm Gonna) Love Me Again" (Rocketman) 
 Sam Mendes (Best Director) – 1917 
 Taron Egerton (Best Performance in a Motion Picture – Musical or Comedy – Actor) – RocketmanBritish nominees:
 1917 (Best Original Score)
 Cats (Best Original Song)
 Marriage Story (Best Motion Picture – Drama, Best Performance in a Motion Picture – Drama – Actor, Best Performance in a Motion Picture – Drama – Actress, Best Screenplay)
 Once Upon a Time in Hollywood (Best Performance in a Motion Picture – Musical or Comedy – Actor, Best Director)
 Rocketman (Best Motion Picture – Musical or Comedy)
 The Two Popes (Best Motion Picture – Drama, Best Performance in a Motion Picture – Drama – Actor, Best Supporting Performance in a Motion Picture – Actor, Best Screenplay)
 Andrew Lloyd Webber (Best Original Song) – "Beautiful Ghosts" (Cats)
 Anthony Hopkins (Best Supporting Performance in a Motion Picture – Actor) – The Two Popes Christian Bale (Best Performance in a Motion Picture – Drama – Actor) – Le Mans '66 Cynthia Erivo (Best Performance in a Motion Picture – Drama – Actress, Best Original Song) – Harriet, "Stand Up" (Harriet)
 Daniel Craig (Best Performance in a Motion Picture – Musical or Comedy – Actor) – Knives Out Daniel Pemberton (Best Original Score) – Motherless Brooklyn Emma Thompson (Best Performance in a Motion Picture – Musical or Comedy – Actress) – Late Night Roman Griffin Davis (Best Performance in a Motion Picture – Musical or Comedy – Actor) – Jojo Rabbit 
 Jonathan Pryce (Best Performance in a Motion Picture – Drama – Actor) – The Two Popes Timothy Lee McKenzie (Best Original Song) – "Spirit" (The Lion King)

Screen Actors Guild Awards
The 26th Screen Actors Guild Awards was presented on 19 January 2019.

British winners:
 Judy (Outstanding Performance by a Female Actor in a Leading Role in a Motion Picture)
 Marriage Story (Outstanding Performance by a Female Actor in a Supporting Role in a Motion Picture)
 Once Upon a Time in Hollywood (Outstanding Performance by a Male Actor in a Supporting Role in a Motion Picture)

British nominees:
 Alfie Allen (Outstanding Performance by a Cast in a Motion Picture) – Jojo Rabbit Christian Bale (Outstanding Performance by a Male Actor in a Leading Role in a Motion Picture) – Le Mans '66 Cynthia Erivo (Outstanding Performance by a Female Actor in a Leading Role in a Motion Picture) – Harriet Damian Lewis (Outstanding Performance by a Cast in a Motion Picture) – Once Upon a Time in Hollywood Malcolm McDowell (Outstanding Performance by a Cast in a Motion Picture) – Bombshell Roman Griffin Davis (Outstanding Performance by a Cast in a Motion Picture) – Jojo Rabbit Taron Egerton (Outstanding Performance by a Male Actor in a Leading Role) – Rocketman 
 Stephen Graham (Outstanding Performance by a Cast in a Motion Picture) – The Irishman Stephen Merchant (Outstanding Performance by a Cast in a Motion Picture) – Jojo Rabbit Marriage Story (Male Actor in a Leading Role in a Motion Picture, Female Actor in a Leading Role in a Motion Picture)
 Once Upon a Time in Hollywood (Outstanding Performance by a Cast in a Motion Picture, Outstanding Performance by a Male Actor in a Leading Role in a Motion Picture, Outstanding Performance by a Stunt Ensemble in a Motion Picture)
 Rocketman'' (Outstanding Performance by a Male Actor in a Leading Role in a Motion Picture)

See also 
Lists of British films
2020 in film
2020 in British music
2020 in British radio
2020 in British television
2020 in the United Kingdom
List of 2020 box office number-one films in the United Kingdom
List of British films of 2019
List of British films of 2021

References

External links
 

2020
Lists of 2020 films by country or language